Yang Shangkui (1905 – November 7, 1986) was a Chinese Communist revolutionary-turned-politician, best known for serving as the First Secretary of his home province Jiangxi between 1955 and 1966, and again between 1976 and 1982.

He was born in Xingguo County, Jiangxi Province, to a family of peasants. As a child, he herded cows and collected manure, and along with his family served the local landowners. He joined a local militia in Xingguo County in his youth. In 1929 when Mao and Zhu De arrived in the Xingguo area, Yang greeted them. He joined the Communist Party in September 1929. He then worked as the head of a local Soviet, as head of propaganda in Ningdu County and then as the party organization leader in Shengli County (later abolished). He worked under Li Fuchun, then head of the party in Jiangxi, and eventually was named party chief of Shicheng County.

He later worked in northeastern China, then returned to Jiangxi. He was purged during the Cultural Revolution and worked as a printing factory worker. He was restored to his government posts in 1973; between 1979 and 1983 he served as the Chairman of the People's Congress of Jiangxi. After completing his term he became a member of the Central Advisory Commission. He died in 1986.

1905 births
1986 deaths
People's Republic of China politicians from Jiangxi
Chinese Communist Party politicians from Jiangxi
Political office-holders in Jiangxi
People from Xingguo County
Politicians from Ganzhou